Broken Social Scene is the third studio album by Broken Social Scene, released on October 4, 2005. In addition to the musicians who contributed to the band's prior release You Forgot It in People, new contributors on Broken Social Scene include k-os, Jason Tait (The Weakerthans) and Murray Lightburn (The Dears).

The initial domestic pressings of the album were issued with a seven-track bonus EP, EP to Be You and Me, a play on Marlo Thomas' children's record album Free to Be... You and Me. The Japanese release is still issued with the EP. The vinyl pressing was released on two records, the first three sides being the album and the fourth being the EP.

The album was certified Gold in Canada on September 14, 2012.

Background
The album was originally to be titled Windsurfing Nation. Additionally, the original artwork was to be a cartoon rendition of Pangaea, which was later scrapped in favor of the current artwork drawn by lead singer Kevin Drew.

The song "Ibi Dreams of Pavement (A Better Day)" refers to Canadian novelist Ibi Kaslik, a friend of the band. It is also suggested that Broken Social Scene is used as basis for a band that appears in Kaslik's second novel The Angel Riots, about a rising indie rock band from Montreal. Kaslik attended the Etobicoke School of the Arts with members of the band and helped them on their first tour of Canada and the United States. Although Kaslik stated "It's definitely based on a world that I know", she brushed off claims that the connection goes very deep, saying "it would be mistaken and scurrilous to try to identify individual people". She warns against "scouring the pages for thinly disguised characterizations of [...] Kevin Drew, [...] Emily Haines or [...] Amy Millan".

Awards and reviews

At the 2006 Juno Awards it won the award for Alternative Album of the Year. It was also shortlisted for the 2006 Polaris Music Prize.

However, the album divided critics more than its predecessor, 2002's You Forgot It in People. Whereas the earlier album had received almost universal critical praise, Broken Social Scenes looser, less structured songs were praised by some critics, but derided by others as self-indulgent and sloppy. Nevertheless, the album reached the number-one position on American college charts and received widespread critical acclaim in the UK. As of 2008, sales in the United States have exceeded 108,000 copies, according to Nielsen SoundScan.

Track listing
All songs written by Kevin Drew and Brendan Canning.

EP to Be You and Me

Despite the EP having a limited release, two music videos were made for the songs, "Her Disappearing Theme" and "Major Label Debut (Fast)".

Singles
 "Ibi Dreams of Pavement (A Better Day)" b/w "All the Gods" (2005, 7")
 "7/4 (Shoreline)" b/w "Stars and Spit" (2006, 7")
 "7/4 (Shoreline)" b/w "Stars and Spit" & "Death Cock" (2006, CDS)
 "Fire Eye'd Boy" b/w "Canada vs. America (Exhaust Pipe Remix)" (2006, 7")

Personnel
 Kevin Drew
 Brendan Canning 
 Andrew Whiteman
 Charles Spearin
 John Crossingham
 Evan Cranley
 Justin Peroff
 James Shaw
 Feist
 Emily Haines
 Jessica Moss
 Ohad Benchetrit
 Martin Davis Kinack
 Torquil Campbell
 Jo-ann Goldsmith
 David Newfeld
 Julie Penner
 Jason Tait
 K-os
 Murray Lightburn
 Noah Mintz
 Louise Upperton

In popular culture
The instrumental introduction to "7/4 (Shoreline)" is used as the theme music for CBC Radio One's Mainstreet programme broadcast on CBHA in Halifax, Nova Scotia.

References

2005 albums
Broken Social Scene albums
Arts & Crafts Productions albums
Juno Award for Alternative Album of the Year albums